Bobby Joe Keesee (February 18, 1934 - December 31, 2010) was a former United States Army sergeant, convicted fraudster and murderer of United States Vice Consul John Patterson and boat racer Harry Christensen.

Early life and military career
Keesee was from a small town in the Texas Panhandle. He dropped out of eighth grade. At age 17 he enlisted in the army and fought in the Korean War. Keesee claimed to have been awarded the Purple Heart and the Bronze Star during the Korean War, however he never did sustain any war time injuries. He returned to the United States in 1953 and decided to make the Army his career, becoming a sergeant and serving on bases in Japan, Germany and Iceland.

Army desertion
In January 1962 he went AWOL from his base at Fort Huachuca, Arizona. On March 23, 1962 he rented an airplane under the guise of visiting a sick relative but instead flew to Havana, Cuba and requested political asylum. He was jailed for 49 days and then sent back to the United States where he was indicted by the federal government. He claimed to be working for the CIA in an attempt to destabilize the communist regime in Cuba. He was convicted of a single count of theft and was sentenced to five years in prison, of which he served three.

North Vietnam prisoner
On September 18, 1970 Keesee hijacked a plane and flew to Hanoi where he was captured and tortured. In 1973 Keesee was released as a prisoner from North Vietnam along other POWs including John McCain.

Murder of US Vice Consul
On Friday, March 22, 1974 at around 10:30 AM Keesee was seen leaving the US consulate in Hermosillo, Mexico with the vice consul John Patterson. Patterson never appeared at his scheduled destination and a note was left at the consulate general hours after his disappearance demanding a ransom of $500,000 as well as a news blackout on the case. The note began with the words "I have evidently been taken hostage by the People’s Liberation Army of Mexico". There was speculation from the outset that the kidnappers were Americans as the ransom note was written on United States made stationary and the ransom was asked for in United States dollars. The United States refused to pay the ransom, as per its stated policy of not giving in to blackmail demands but allowed his wife to attempt to do so.

Andra attempted to deliver $250,000 as ransom but Keesee did not appear. The case caused confusion with Mexican officials refusing to even call it a kidnapping, simply saying that he disappeared. On March 30, 1974, a Mexican government spokesman said they expected Patterson to be released that weekend. Two hundred Mexican police officials combed the desert in search of Patterson.

Patterson's badly decomposed body was found in the dessert 345 miles north of Hermosillo by a peasant looking for fruit. The skull was broken by blows to the face and back. There was a ring on his finger with his and his wife's initials on it.

FBI agents in Southern California identified Keesee as a person of interest after finding that he checked into the Hotel Gandara in Mexico near the consulate. An administrative assistant who had spotted Patterson leaving was able to identify Keesee as the person he left with. The voice on the phone call to the consul general on April 10 was also found to be Keesee’s. 

Keesee was arrested on May 28, 1974 in Huntington Beach, California. A pair of handcuffs and two shotgun shells were found in his car.

Keesee confessed that he wrote the letter instructing Patterson’s wife to go to the Rosarito Beach hotel to bring the ransom but claimed he did so only to provide her with a sense of hope. He otherwise denied involvement in Patterson’s abduction.

During pretrial preparations prosecutors offered Keesee a plea deal allowing him to plead guilty to a single count of conspiracy to kidnap.

On April 28, 1975, Keesee was sentenced to 20 years in prison and was paroled in 1986.

FEMA scam
On January 4, 1996, Keesee pleaded guilty to impersonating a FEMA official in Long Beach, CA as he distributed fraudulent purchase orders that were purportedly to buy equipment to fight disasters.

Murder of Harry Christensen
On January 6, 1999, Keesee shot Harry Christensen, a championship power boat racer and owner of a custom boat business.

Keesee was responding to an advertisement for Christensen’s plane.

Keesee was arrested on January 7, 1999 with Christensen’s ring, watch and credit cards in his possession. The body was found on May 2 in a remote desert in Sandoval County, NM.

To avoid a death sentence, Keessee pleaded guilty to multiple charges. On March 31, 2000, Keesee was sentenced to two life terms without parole.

Death
Keesee died of lung cancer in prison in December 2010.

References

2010 deaths
Vietnam War prisoners of war
American torture victims
American defectors